NSS Hindu College, Changanassery, one of the largest and oldest NSS institution of higher education in Kerala. It was founded in 1947 by Bharata Kesari Mannath Padmanabhan and is situated in Changanassery (Town). Hindu College is an institution of the Nair Service Society.

History
NSS Hindu College is the first college of Nair Service Society (NSS) and one of the prominent institutions came into being in 1947. The college epitomizes the glorious vision and objectives of Mannathu Padmanabhan the founder of Nair Service Society which has been well known presence in the Kerala Social and cultural activities. The college was formally inaugurated in 1956 by Dr. S. Radhakrishnan, the Vice-President of India. On this occasion is inaugurated by hoisting the flag by His Highness The Maharaja of Travancore Sri. Chithira Thirunal Balarama Varma. The college building was formally opened by K. M. Munshi, the Governor of Uttar Pradesh.

Notable alumni
 Acharya Narendra Bhooshan
 Ambalapuzha Gopakumar
 Ramesh Chennithala
 Rajeev Pillai
 Prabha Varma
 Janardhanan 
 Parvathy Jayaram
 Suresh Kurup
 Praveena
 Tony Mathew
 G. Marthandan
 Jayakrishnan
 Divya Padmini 
 Johny Antony
 Swaroop Philip
 Vishnu Narayan

References

Nair Service Society colleges
Colleges affiliated to Mahatma Gandhi University, Kerala
Arts and Science colleges in Kerala
Universities and colleges in Kottayam district
Educational institutions established in 1947
1947 establishments in India
Changanassery